Gerald McRath (born June 16, 1986) is a former American football linebacker. He was drafted by the Tennessee Titans in the fourth round of the 2009 NFL Draft. McRath played college football for the Southern Miss Golden Eagles. He is currently an Assistant Defensive Coach at Maple Wood High School in Nashville, Tennessee.

Early years
He played high school football at McEachern High School in Powder Springs.

Professional career
McRath ran a 4.59 sec 40-yard dash, best among linebackers in the 2009 NFL Draft.

McRath was suspended for the first 4 games of the 2010 season for violating NFL policy on performance-enhancing substances.

References

External links
Southern Miss Golden Eagles bio
Official Gerald McRath Website
http://www.berryvikings.com/sports/fball/coaches/Gerald_McRath?view=bio

1986 births
Living people
People from Powder Springs, Georgia
American football linebackers
Southern Miss Golden Eagles football players
Tennessee Titans players
Sportspeople from Cobb County, Georgia
Players of American football from Georgia (U.S. state)